Andrew Mercier (born 1985) is a Canadian politician and trade unionist who was elected to the Legislative Assembly of British Columbia in the 2020 British Columbia general election. He represents the electoral district of Langley as a member of the British Columbia New Democratic Party.

Early life and education
Raised in Langley, British Columbia, Mercier graduated from the University of New Brunswick with a Bachelor of Arts Degree and in 2017 graduated from the Schulich School of Law at Dalhousie University with a Juris Doctor.

Before politics
Prior to his election, Mercier held a variety of positions within the labour movement, most recently serving as the Executive Director of the B.C. Building Trades Council and as legal counsel for Teamsters Local 213.

Electoral record

References 

Living people
People from Langley, British Columbia (city)
21st-century Canadian politicians
British Columbia New Democratic Party MLAs
1985 births